The Asian Gymnastics Union (AGU) is the governing body of gymnastics in Asia. It is one of the five continental confederations making up the International Gymnastics Federation (FIG). AGU was formed in October 1964 during the 1964 Summer Olympics in Tokyo (Japan), with Japan, South Korea, China and Philippines being the founder members. AGU has headquarters in Qatar and consists of 37 member federations.

History
Asian Gymnastics Union (AGU) was formed as Asian Gymnastics Federation (AGF) in October 1964 during the 1964 Summer Olympics in Tokyo (Japan) with 4 national federations as founding members; Japan, South Korea, China and Philippines. 
The first congress held in Tokyo in June 1966 and Mr. Yoshihiko Kurimoto (Japan) become the first President. The organization held the first Asian Acrobatic Gymnastics Championships in 1992 in British Hong Kong, with teams from 4 member federations participating.

Tournaments
 Asian Gymnastics Championships
 Asian Games
 Southeast Asian Games
  Asian Indoor and Martial Arts Games (defunct)

Members
Central South Asian Zone

 
 Bangladesh

 Islamic Republic of Pakistan

West Asian Zone

South East Asian Zone

 Philippines

East Asian Zone

 Macau, China

References

External links
  

Asia
G
National members of the Asian Gymnastics Union
Union
Sports organizations established in 1964
1964 establishments in Japan